Galon, Gal-on, etc. may refer to:

 Gal On, a kibbutz in Israel's southern lowlands
 Zehava Gal-On, an Israeli politician
 Galon, a Burmese term for Garuda, a legendary bird or bird-like creature in Hindu, Buddhist and Jain faith
 Galon or Gallon, bishop of Beauvais (c. 1099-1104) and Paris (1104-1116)

See also
 Gallon,  a measure of volume of approximately four litres
 Galloon, a metallic braid used for trimming clothing and uniforms